Whisper to the Wild Water is a music album by Irish musician Máire Brennan, now known as Moya Brennan. This was the fourth solo outing for her, released in 1999. At the 43rd Annual Grammy Awards in 2001, it was nominated for the Best New Age Album.

Recordings were made in various studios in Ireland during 1999:

Pulse Recording Studios, Dublin, Ireland – (Engineer Tim Martin)
Windmill Lane Studios, Dublin, Ireland – (Engineer Tim Martin)
Mo Studios, Dublin, Ireland – (Engineer Tim Martin)
Tony Perrey was the engineer for "Mary of the Gaels" and "Sign from the Hills".

Track listing

Personnel

Band
Moya Brennan – Vocals, Harp, Keyboards
Anthony Drennan – Guitars
Máire Breatnach – Fiddle, Viola
Mairtín O'Connor – Accordion
Joe Csibi – Double Bass
Keith Duffy – Bass 
Denis Woods – Keyboards

Additional musicians
Paul Jarvis – Vocals (on Peacemaker)
Máire's Band
Dee Brennan – Vocals, Percussion
Sinéad Madden – Vocals, Fiddle
Ewan Cowley – Vocals, Guitar
David MacMullan – Keyboards, Piano
Tiarnan O'Duinnchinn – Uilleann pipes, Low Whistle
Tony Steele – Bass
Paul Byrne – Percussion
Cór Mhuire na Doirí beaga – St. Mary's Church Choir of the Derrybegs (on I Láthair Dé)
Baba Brennan – Choir Leader
Dee Brennan – Choir Conductor

Commercial singles
"Follow the Word"

Promotional singles
"Follow the Word"

Release details
1999, UK, Word/Universal Records 7012632267, Release Date 19 October 1999, CD 
1999, USA, Word/Sony Records ?, Release Date 19 October 1999, CD 
1999, USA, Word/Sony Records 7012632259, Release Date 19 October 1999, Cassette
1999, Japan, Epic Records ESCA 8102, Release Date 19 October 1999, CD 
2000, UK, Word/Universal Records 157 560-2, Release Date ? February 2000, CD

References

Moya Brennan albums
1999 albums